David Francis Carroll (born 20 September 1966 in Paisley, Scotland) is a former footballer who spent 14 seasons at Wycombe Wanderers. An attacking midfielder, Carroll played more than 600 first-team games for Wycombe in all competitions, and scored exactly 100 goals. He was nicknamed "Jesus" by the Wycombe supporters.

Carroll joined Wycombe, then a recently promoted Conference side, in the summer of 1988, having previously played for Ruislip Manor of the Isthmian League. He went on to become a key member of the Wycombe side that won promotion to Football League in 1993. The following season, Wycombe won a second successive promotion as Carroll scored twice in Wycombe's 4-2 victory against Preston in the playoff final at Wembley.

In November 1997, Carroll was rewarded for his long service to the Chairboys with a  testimonial match against Leicester City. Near the end of his career at Adams Park, no longer a first-team regular, Carroll played the final ten minutes of Wycombe's famous FA Cup semi-final against Liverpool in 2001.

In March 2002, Carroll left Wycombe on a free transfer to join Aldershot Town. He spent eight months at Aldershot, and finished his career at Windsor & Eton.

Carroll now works as Manager for Space Station plc.

Honours
Wycombe Wanderers
FA Trophy: 1990–91, 1992–93

References

External links
 
 Chairboys on the Net: Dave Carroll profile

1966 births
Living people
Scottish footballers
English Football League players
Wycombe Wanderers F.C. players
Aldershot Town F.C. players
Footballers from Paisley, Renfrewshire
Association football midfielders